Jazz – musical style that originated at the beginning of the 20th century in African American communities in the Southern United States, mixing African music and European classical music traditions.

Jazz is a music genre that originated from African American communities of New Orleans in the United States during the late 19th and early 20th centuries. It emerged in the form of independent traditional and popular musical styles, all linked by the common bonds of African American and European American musical parentage with a performance orientation.

Jazz spans a period of over a hundred years, encompassing a very wide range of music, making it difficult to define. Jazz makes heavy use of improvisation, polyrhythms, syncopation and the swing note, as well as aspects of European harmony, American popular music, the brass band tradition, and African musical elements such as blue notes and African-American styles such as ragtime.

Although the foundation of jazz is deeply rooted within the black experience of the United States, different cultures have contributed their own experience and styles to the art form as well. Intellectuals around the world have hailed jazz as "one of America's original art forms".

As jazz spread around the world, it drew on different national, regional, and local musical cultures, which gave rise to many distinctive styles. New Orleans jazz began in the early 1910s, combining earlier brass-band marches, French quadrilles, biguine, ragtime and blues with collective polyphonic improvisation.

In the 1930s, heavily arranged dance-oriented swing big bands, Kansas City jazz, a hard-swinging, bluesy, improvisational style and Gypsy jazz (a style that emphasized musette waltzes) were the prominent styles. Bebop emerged in the 1940s, shifting jazz from danceable popular music towards a more challenging "musician's music" which was played at faster tempos and used more chord-based improvisation. Cool jazz developed in the end of the 1940s, introducing calmer, smoother sounds and long, linear melodic lines.

The 1950s saw the emergence of free jazz, which explored playing without regular meter, beat and formal structures, and in the mid-1950s, hard bop emerged, which introduced influences from rhythm and blues, gospel, and blues, especially in the saxophone and piano playing. Modal jazz developed in the late 1950s, using the mode, or musical scale, as the basis of musical structure and improvisation.

Jazz-rock fusion appeared in the late 1960s and early 1970s, combining jazz improvisation with rock music's rhythms, electric instruments and the highly amplified stage sound. In the early 1980s, a commercial form of jazz fusion called smooth jazz became successful, garnering significant radio airplay. Other styles and genres abound in the 2000s, such as Latin and Afro-Cuban jazz.

What type of thing is jazz? 

Jazz can be described as all of the following:
 Music – art and cultural form whose medium is sound and silence. Its common elements are pitch (which governs melody and harmony), rhythm (and its associated concepts tempo, meter, and articulation), dynamics, and the sonic qualities of timbre and texture. The word derives from Greek μουσική (mousike; "art of the Muses").
 Music genre – conventional category that identifies pieces of music as belonging to a shared tradition or set of conventions. It is to be distinguished from musical form and musical style, although in practice these terms are sometimes used interchangeably.

Musical instruments typically associated with jazz

Jazz genres

Jazz fusion 

Jazz fusion

Regional scenes

Local scenes 
 Cape jazz
 Kansas City jazz
 Dixieland
 West Coast jazz

Jazz compositions

Jazz standards 
 Jazz standard – musical composition which is an important part of the musical repertoire of jazz musicians, in that it is widely known, performed, and recorded by jazz musicians, and widely known by listeners. Jazz standards include jazz arrangements of popular Broadway songs, blues songs and well-known jazz tunes.
 List of pre-1920 jazz standards
 List of 1920s jazz standards
 List of 1930s jazz standards
 List of 1940s jazz standards
 List of post-1950 jazz standards

Jazz discographies

History of jazz 
 Timeline of jazz education

Stylistic origins 
 Blues
 Folk
 March
 Ragtime

Cultural origins 
 Early 1910s New Orleans

Mainstream popularity
 1920s–1960s, although popularity and development as a genre persists into the present.

Derivatives
 Jump blues
 Rhythm and blues
 Rock and roll
 Ska
 Reggae
 Funk

Years in jazz

Jazz culture

Jazz organizations 
 List of jazz institutions and organizations

Jazz publications 
 JazzTimes
 Down Beat
 Jazz Review
 Jazz Improv
 All About Jazz

Persons influential in jazz

Jazz musicians 
 List of jazz musicians

Jazz musicians, by instrument

Jazz musicians, by genre

See also 

 Glossary of jazz and popular musical terms
 Outline of music
 Victorian Jazz Archive

References

External links 

 Jazz Foundation of America
 Jazz @ the Smithsonian
 Encyclopedia of Jazz Musicians
 Alabama Jazz Hall of Fame website
 Jazz Artist and Discography Resource
 Red Hot Jazz.com
 Jazz at Lincoln Center website
 Jazz At Lincoln Center Hall of Fame
 American Jazz Museum website
 The International Archives for the Jazz Organ
 Classic and Contemporary Jazz Music
 The Jazz Archive at Duke University
 Jazz Festivals in Europe
  Free 1920s Jazz Collection available for downloading at Archive.org
 A List of Jazz Lists

 
Jazz
Jazz